Derambila is a genus of moths in the family Geometridae first described by Francis Walker in 1863.

Description
Its palpi are porrect (extending forward) and hairy. Antennae long and slender, minutely serrate in male, which is ciliated in female. Legs very long and slender. Fore tibia short and hind tibia with fold and tuft, and without spurs in female. Forewings with vein 3 from long before angle of cell. Veins 7 to 9 stalked from before upper angle and vein 10 absent. Vein 11 becoming coincident with vein 12. Hindwings with vein 3 from before angle of cell. Vein 5 from middle of discocellulars and vein 6 and 7 stalked.

Species
 Derambila alucitaria (Snellen, 1873)
 Derambila biokensis Herbulot, 1998
 Derambila candidissima Prout
 Derambila costipunctata Warren, 1905
 Derambila catharina Prout, 1910
 Derambila costata (Warren, 1896)
 Derambila delostigma Prout, 1915
 Derambila dentifera (Moore, 1888)
 Derambila dentiscripta (Bastelberger, 1909)
 Derambila fragilis (Butler, 1880)
 Derambila herbuloti Holloway, 1996
 Derambila hyperphyes (Prout, 1911)
 Derambila idiosceles Turner, 1930
 Derambila iridoptera (Prout, 1913)
 Derambila jacksoni Prout, 1915
 Derambila larula Bastelberger, 1909
 Derambila liosceles Turner, 1930
 Derambila livens Prout, 1931
 Derambila lumenaria (Geyer, 1832)
 Derambila macritibia Prout, 1929
 Derambila manca (Swinhoe, 1902)
 Derambila manfredi Holloway, 1996
 Derambila marginepunctata Bastelberger, 1909
 Derambila melagonata (Walker, [1863])
 Derambila niphosphaeras (Prout, 1934)
 Derambila permensata (Walker, [1863])
 Derambila propages Prout, 1926
 Derambila puella (Butler, 1880)
 Derambila punctisignata Walker, [1863]
 Derambila rectiscripta Prout
 Derambila saponaria (Guenée, 1857)
 Derambila satelliata Walker
 Derambila syllaria (Swinhoe, 1904)
 Derambila synecdema Prout, 1910
 Derambila thearia (Swinhoe, 1904)
 Derambila thrombocnemis Prout, 1929
 Derambila zanclopterata (Walker, [1863])
 Derambila zinctaria (Guenée, 1857)

References

 
 

Desmobathrinae